Introverted Intuition is the debut studio album by American recording artist and record producer Lance Skiiiwalker. It was released on October 18, 2016, by Top Dawg Entertainment. The album features guest appearances from fellow Top Dawg artist and American rapper ScHoolboy Q, and Michael Anthony. The album's production was handled by Skiiiwalker himself credited as "Rocket", alongside fellow TDE producers messi as Dave Free, Sounwave and Tae Beast, along with others such as B. New, Ben Shepherd, Carter Lang, DJ Dahi, Frank Dukes, J. LBS., O'bonjour, Peter CottonTale and THEMpeople.

Track listing

2016 debut albums
Top Dawg Entertainment albums
Albums produced by DJ Dahi
Albums produced by Sounwave
Albums produced by Frank Dukes
Albums produced by Tae Beast
Albums produced by Dave Free